Special Field Orders, No. 15 (series 1865) were military orders issued during the American Civil War, on January 16, 1865, by General William Tecumseh Sherman, commander of the Military Division of the Mississippi of the United States Army.

The orders were issued following Sherman's March to the Sea. They were intended to address the immediate problem of dealing with the tens of thousands of black refugees who had joined Sherman's march in search of protection and sustenance, and "to assure the harmony of action in the area of operations." Critics allege that his intention was for the order to be a temporary measure to address an immediate problem, and not to grant permanent ownership of the land to the freedmen, although most of the recipients assumed otherwise. General Sherman issued his orders four days after meeting with twenty local black ministers and lay leaders and with U.S. Secretary of War Edwin M. Stanton in Savannah, Georgia. Brig. Gen. Rufus Saxton, an abolitionist from Massachusetts who had previously organized the recruitment of black soldiers for the Union Army, was put in charge of implementing the orders. Freedmen were settled in Georgia, particularly along the Savannah River, in the Ogeechee district of Chatham County, and on islands off of the coast of Savannah.

In the end, the orders had little concrete effect because President Andrew Johnson issued a proclamation that returned the lands to southern owners who took a loyalty oath.  Johnson granted amnesty to most former Confederates and allowed the rebel states to elect new governments. These governments, which often included ex-Confederate officials, soon enacted black codes, measures designed to control and repress the recently freed slave population. General Saxton and his staff at the Charleston SC Freedmen Bureau's office refused to carry out President Johnson's wishes and denied all applications to have lands returned.  In the end, Johnson and his allies removed General Saxton and his staff, but not before Congress was able to provide legislation to assist some families in keeping their lands.

Although mules are not mentioned in the orders, they were a main source for the expression "forty acres and a mule."  A historical marker commemorating the order is in Savannah, near the corner of Harris and Bull streets, in Madison Square.

Orders

Publication in the Official Record
This order is part of the Official Records of the American Civil War. It can be found in Series I — Military Operations, Volume XLVII, Part II, Pages 60–62. The volume was published in 1895.

See also
 Forty acres and a mule

References

American Civil War documents
Slavery in the United States
Reconstruction Era
William Tecumseh Sherman
Florida in the American Civil War
Georgia (U.S. state) in the American Civil War
South Carolina in the American Civil War
General orders
January 1865 events
Military emancipation in the American Civil War